Blood and Thunder (2023) was a professional wrestling supercard event produced by Major League Wrestling (MLW), which took place on January 7, 2023 at the 2300 Arena in Philadelphia, Pennsylvania. It was the third event under the MLW Blood and Thunder chronology, and also featured wrestlers from the Dragon Gate promotion.

Originally a television taping for MLW Fusion, matches and segments from the event would also air on the promotion's new flagship series, MLW Underground Wrestling, which premiered on February 7, 2023.

Production

Background
On November 2, 2022, MLW announced that Blood and Thunder took place on January 7, 2023 at the 2300 Arena in Philadelphia.

Storylines
The supercard consists of matches that result from scripted storylines, where wrestlers portrayed villains, heroes, or less distinguishable characters in scripted events that built tension and culminated in a wrestling match or series of matches, with results predetermined by MLW's writers. Storylines are played out on MLW's weekly series, Fusion and Azteca, as well as the league's social media platforms.

Through MLW's "Open Door Policy", several free agents have been signed on for the event. This includes Game Changer Wrestling mainstays Billie Starkz and Rickey Shane Page, as well as the MLW return of Johnny Fusion (formerly known by his real name of John Hennigan). Several names from MLW's partner Dragon Gate will also be featured, including Ben-K, La Estrella, and Yamato.

On the January 13, 2022 episode of MLW Azteca, 2021 Opera Cup winner Davey Richards was found to be attacked, with the Opera Cup Trophy haven been stolen from his possession. For much of the year, speculation rose about who stole the trophy. At Fightland, 2019 Opera Cup winner Davey Boy Smith Jr. - making his return to MLW in nearly two years - teamed with his cousins The Billignton Bulldogs (Thomas and Mark Billington) to defeat The Bomaye Fight Club (Alex Kane, Myron Reed, and Mr. Thomas). After the match, Smith cut a promo accusing Kane of haven stolen the Opera Cup Trophy, while promising to make Kane submit the next time they wrestle. That was proven true when it was revealed that Kane now possessed the trophy on the December 2 episode of Fusion. The trophy, now with visible damage, had been renamed the "Bomaye Cup of the Gods" by Kane; and stated that even if MLW were to hold the Opera Cup tournament again, he would still keep the trophy. On December 14, MLW announced on their website that Kane and Smith will face each other at Blood and Thunder. Additionally, MLW announced on December 27 that The Billington Bulldogs will face The BFC's Reed and Thomas in a tag team match.

Results

References

Events in Philadelphia
2023 in professional wrestling
Major League Wrestling shows
January 2023 sports events in the United States
Professional wrestling in Philadelphia